Voices is an album by Mike Stern, released in 2001 through Atlantic Records. The album reached a peak position of number twenty-three on Billboard Top Jazz Albums chart.

Track listing

Personnel
Credits adapted from AllMusic.

 Mike Stern – guitar
 Michael Brecker – saxophone
 Jon Herington – rhythm guitar
 Richard Bona – bass, kalimba, vocals
 Chris Minh Doky – double bass
 Lincoln Goines – bass guitar
 Dennis Chambers – drums
 Vinnie Colaiuta – drums
 Bob Franceschini – saxophone
 Philip Hamilton – vocals
 Elisabeth Kontomanou – vocals
 Arto Tuncboyaciyan – percussion, vocals
 Jim Beard – production, keyboards
 Bart Migal – engineering
 Greg Calbi – mastering

References

2001 albums
Mike Stern albums
Atlantic Records albums